Tintinhull is a tiny hamlet about 10 kilometers east of Tamworth, New South Wales, Australia. It is situated between Nemingha and Kootingal, and lies on the New England Highway. The locality is 466 km from Sydney, on the Main North Rail Line which opened in 1885 and closed in December 1971.
 
Tintinhull has no shop or petrol station, but it does have a primary school with about 50 students, a pottery, and a pyramid shaped observatory. The main rise is called Goat Hill.

References

Suburbs of Tamworth, New South Wales
Main North railway line, New South Wales